Woking Borough Council is the local authority for the borough of Woking in the county of Surrey, England. The council consists of 30 councillors, three for each of the 10 wards in the town. It is currently controlled by the Liberal Democrat Party, led by Ann-Marie Barker. The borough council is based at Woking Civic Offices.

History 
Woking Local Board was established in 1893. Such local boards became urban districts in December 1894 under the Local Government Act 1894, and so the local board was replaced by Woking Urban District Council. The urban district was significantly enlarged in 1907 when it absorbed Horsell parish and again in 1933 when it absorbed Byfleet and Pyrford parishes.

On 1 April 1974 the district became a non-metropolitan district, altering its powers and responsibilities, although keeping the same area. The reformed district was also awarded borough status at the same time, with the council thereafter being called Woking Borough Council.

The first woman elected to the council was Elizabeth Balfour in 1919.

See also 
 Woking Borough Council elections

References

Non-metropolitan district councils of England
Local authorities in Surrey
Borough Council